The House Is Black is an acclaimed Iranian documentary short film directed by Forugh Farrokhzad.

The film is a look at life and suffering in a leper colony and focuses on the human condition and the beauty of creation. It is spliced with Farrokhzad's narration of quotes from the Old Testament, the Koran and her own poetry. The film features footage from the Bababaghi Hospice leper colony. It was the only film she directed before her death in 1967. After shooting this film she adopted a child from the colony.

Although the film attracted little attention outside Iran when released, it has since been recognized as a landmark in Iranian film. Reviewer Eric Henderson described the film as "[o]ne of the prototypal essay films, The House Is Black paved the way for the Iranian New Wave." In 1963, the film was awarded the grand prize for the category documentary at the International Short Film Festival Oberhausen in West Germany.

References

Notes
 Hamid Dabashi, Masters & Masterpieces of Iranian Cinema, 451 p. (Mage Publishers, Washington, DC, 2007); Chapter II, pp. 39–70: Forough Farrokhzad; The House Is Black.

External links

1960s short documentary films
1963 documentary films
1963 films
Documentary films about health care
East Azerbaijan Province
Iranian short documentary films
Leprosy
1960s Persian-language films
Films about disability